1999 World Ice Hockey Championships may refer to:
 1999 Men's World Ice Hockey Championships
 1999 IIHF Women's World Championship